William Edward DeVaughn Jr. (born November 28, 1947) is an American R&B/soul singer, songwriter and guitarist, best known for the million-selling hit song "Be Thankful for What You Got" in 1974.

Biography
DeVaughn was a salaried government employee as a drafting technician, and a part-time singer. He wrote a song called "A Cadillac Don't Come Easy", which was eventually re-written to become "Be Thankful for What You Got", in 1972. He spent $900 towards getting it recorded with Omega Sound, a Philadelphia production house. The record's producer at Omega, John Davis (a member of the MFSB studio session group), came up with a smooth arrangement, eventually booking time to record at Sigma Sound Studios in Philadelphia, used by Philadelphia International Records. Studio owner and chief engineer Joe Tarsia recorded and mixed the track.

The session featured members of the MFSB group – guitarists Norman Harris and Bobby Eli, drummer Earl Young, vibraphonist Vince Montana and percussionist Larry Washington; secured by Allan Felder, who also developed the separate ad-lib back-up chorus with his sister's vocal group. John Davis played keyboards on the track. Frank Fioravanti, the executive producer and co-ordinator, secured the song's release on Roxbury Records, a subsidiary of Chelsea Records, run by industry veteran Wes Farrell.

The record sold nearly two million copies on its release in spring 1974, reaching No. 1 on the US Billboard R&B chart and No. 4 on the Billboard Hot 100. The track saw two chart entries in the UK, with the record peaking at #31 (1974) and also #44 (1980), in the UK Singles Chart. It was awarded a gold disc by the RIAA on May 31, 1974. With a sound and content influenced by Curtis Mayfield, its simple and encouraging lyrics hit home, to the extent that it became featured on gospel radio stations. When his success as a recording artist seemed guaranteed, DeVaughn quit his government job.

DeVaughn released an album, mainly of songs with a religious character, and its second single, "Blood Is Thicker than Water", reached No. 10 R&B and No. 43 pop later in 1974; "Give the Little Man a Great Big Hand" had only minor R&B chart success early the following year. Live, DeVaughn preached to and admonished his audience from the stage. He lost interest in the music industry not long afterwards, working in a record store and again as a draftsman.

Fioravanti destined DeVaughn's 1980 effort, named after a new song by DeVaughn, Figures Can't Calculate to TEC Records in Philadelphia. The title song climbed to No. 37 in the Billboard R&B chart, and a remake of "Be Thankful for What You Got" was also included on the album.

In 2004, DeVaughn released a new single, "I Came Back", on his own Mighty Two Diamond Records. In 2014, two previously unreleased DeVaughn tracks, "Staying Power" and "Love Ballad of the Year" were included on the Sound Gems Records oldies compilation Lost Soul Gems. In December 2016, an additional previously unreleased track, "Love in Any Language" was added to the Lost Soul Gems collection. All of these later tracks were written by Fioravanti and others.

On May 12, 2017, a two-song medley, "What Does It Take (to Win Your Love for Me)" and "I Gotta Dance to Keep from Crying" was released on Sound Gems Records.

Discography

Studio albums

Singles

References

External links
 
 Breath of Life article

1947 births
Living people
African-American musicians
Singers from Washington, D.C.
American soul singers
21st-century African-American people
20th-century African-American people